Quinter is a surname. Notable people with the surname include: 

Bill Quinter (1939–2014), American and Canadian football player, coach, and executive
Neil F. Quinter (born 1962), American politician

See also
Quintero (surname)